That's Happiness is a 1911 American silent short film drama directed by George Nichols. The film starred William Garwood and Bertha Blanchard.

Cast
 Bertha Blanchard as The Wealthy Old Woman
 William Garwood as The Wealthy Old Woman's Son

External links

1911 films
1911 drama films
Thanhouser Company films
Silent American drama films
American silent short films
American black-and-white films
1911 short films
Films directed by George Nichols
1910s American films